Alec Su You-peng (born 11 September 1973) is a Taiwanese actor, singer, television producer, and film director.

Su became a popular teen idol in the 1980s as a member of the boyband Xiao Hu Dui. He was known as the "Obedient Tiger" (乖乖虎).

The 1998–1999 hit TV series My Fair Princess marked a turning point in Su's career. Since then, he has had a successful career in acting, starring in highly popular dramas such as The Legendary Siblings (1999), Romance in the Rain (2001), and The Heaven Sword and Dragon Saber (2003). Su has won awards from Hundred Flowers Awards and Macau International Movie Festival for the films The Message (2009) and A Tibetan Love Song (2010) respectively.

In 2013, he produced the TV series Destiny by Love. In 2015, he directed the film The Left Ear.

Career

Musical: Xiao Hu Dui (Little Tigers)

Alec Su's career started in 1988, at the age of 15, when he joined the Little Tigers trio. The band was the first idol singing group that debuted in the Taiwanese music industry and Alec was labelled as the "obedient tiger." The group's popularity was unprecedented; the Little Tigers attracted fans from Taiwan, Hong Kong, China, Singapore, and amongst Chinese communities around the world. The success of the band began the new generation of Taiwanese pop culture in the early 1990s. In 2010, the Little Tigers were invited to participate in the CCTV Spring Festival Gala, in which they sang a medley of three of their biggest hits and won accolades as the "favorite singing group" for the event.

Apart from being a popular singer, during this period Su was epitomized by the general public as a superior student. He attended Taiwan's number one high school, Taipei Municipal Jianguo High School and was accepted into the prestigious National Taiwan University, where he majored in Mechanical Engineering . Su's experiences describing his high school years, preparing for the Taiwan university entrance examinations while trying to also juggle his performing schedule as a member of a wildly popular singing group, are recorded in his 1995 book entitled My Days at Jian Zhong / Youth Never Die.

However, as Su became so well known at such a young age, he felt that he had lost his freedom as a result of being in the limelight. At the age of 21, a year before his university graduation in Taiwan, Su decided to leave school and study abroad in England.

Television

In 1995, after the breakup of Little Tigers, Su embarked on an acting career. His role as the Wu Ah Ge, Yongqi in the Chinese TV series blockbuster My Fair Princess I and II won him fame as a television actor in 1997. He continued in 2000 with another hit TV series Romance in the Rain. His later TV series include Heavenly Sword and Dragon Sabre (2002), Magic Touch of Fate (2004, costarring Taiwanese actress Ruby Lin and Korean singer Kang Ta), and Mischievous Princess (2005). He collaborated with Korean actress Chae Rim in two 2003 productions, Love of the Aegean Sea and Warriors of the Yang Clan.

In 2006, Su appeared in the 1930s drama Jiang Ji Jiu Ji co-starring with Li Qian, Cecilia Ye Tong, and Paul Chun, and which aired in Spring 2007. In 2008 he acted in the TV drama Re Ai, which aired in the spring of 2009.

In 2013-2014, Su was one of the judges on the fifth season of China's Got Talent alongside Liu Ye, Wang Wei-Chung, and former co-star Zhao Wei.

Film

In recent years, Su has been concentrating on his film career. Since the second half of 2008 he has participated in more than a half-dozen film projects. Su also appears in the ensemble piece, Fit Lover, which had a November 2008 release, as well as guest starring in a short Taiwan film, L-O-V-E. The high-profile 1940s-period espionage drama, The Message, had a wide release in Asia in autumn 2009, has been included in several international film festivals, and received several nominations (and one win, for Li Bing Bing as "Best Actress") for the 2009 Golden Horse awards. A Singing Fairy, shot in Guangxi Province, and a biography of Macau composer Xian Xinghai, titled The Star and the Sea, both opened in limited release in December 2009. The Four Cupids, a romantic comedy, premiered in April 2010. Film projects for 2010 included A Tibetan Love Song (romantic drama filmed in Tibetan Autonomous Prefecture) and Lost in Panic Room, a "locked room" detective thriller. Both premiered in the fall of 2010. A sequel to the detective film, titled Lost in Panic Cruise, was released for Halloween 2011. Su continues his film career with several completed movies scheduled for release in 2012, and another currently in production.

In October 2010, Alec won the Hundred Flowers Award for "Best Supporting Actor" for his role in The Message. In December 2010, he won the "Best Actor" award at the 2nd Macau International Movie Festival, for his performance in A Tibetan Love Song

Along with his TV and film success, Su has released thirty top-selling albums, starting as a member of The Little Tigers group. As a solo artist he has released 14 albums, beginning in 1992 with I Only Want You to Love Me to his 2004 release Before and After. In January 2012 Su performed, along with singers Daniel Chan, Aska Yang, and Will Pan, in the 2012 Fantasy Stars Chinese New Year Concert, MGM Grand Garden Arena, Las Vegas.

In April 2017, Su announced a business partnership in the Beijing film industry with Vicki Zhao.

Filmography

Television series

Film

As actor

As director

Variety and reality show

Discography

Albums

Soundtrack
2004: Love of the Aegean Sea original soundtrack

Awards and nominations

Books
1995 (revised 2003): 青春的場所 (My Days at Jian Zhong / Youth Never Die)

References

External links
Blog - Alec's Sina blog
Microblog weibo - Alec's Sina Microblog weibo 新浪微博

1973 births
Living people
National Taiwan University alumni
Taiwanese male film actors
Male actors from Taipei
Taiwanese Buddhists
Taiwanese male television actors
Musicians from Taipei
Taiwanese people of Hakka descent
Film directors from Taipei
Taiwanese television producers
21st-century Taiwanese male actors
21st-century Taiwanese male  singers
20th-century Taiwanese male actors
20th-century Taiwanese male  singers
Taiwanese Mandopop singers
Cantonese-language singers of Taiwan
Taiwanese male stage actors
Taiwanese male voice actors
Hakka musicians
Taiwanese idols